Gufeng music is a type of music genre by artists originating from the Greater China region, It is a kind of C-pop music with the background of Chinese legends, the style of Chinese folk songs and drama, the melody that is similar to classical Chinese music and played by classical Chinese musical instruments. It is similar but slightly different from Zhongguo feng music.

The lyrics of Gufeng music are created mainly based on ancient Chinese mythological legends and verses. In recent years, this kind of songs are often used in Xianxia, Wuxia games, anime, dramas, etc. This kind of music has also become popular among Internet cultures such as Hanfu movement.

History 
Gufeng music was usually called Xianxia music (仙侠; xianxia being a genre of Chinese fiction that is similar to wuxia, but with more mythological elements), and what now seems like a movement began rather quietly in 2005, calling for netizens to write lyrics with ancient-styled poems for the music in some popular PC games, including The Legend of Sword and Fairy and Fairy and Sword of Xuanyuan. The name seems to derive from the namesake lyricist column on Fenbei, and the basic concept of Chinoiserie music among netizens came out from that group.

References and sources 
References

External links
 Chinese music sharing site 5sing for Chinoiserie music

Internet culture
 
Chinese popular culture
Chinese youth culture